The 2016–17 Northern Colorado Bears men's basketball team represented the University of Northern Colorado during the 2016–17 NCAA Division I men's basketball season. The Bears were led by first-year head coach Jeff Linder and played their home games at Bank of Colorado Arena in Greeley, Colorado. They were members of the Big Sky Conference. They finished the season 11–18, 7–11 in Big Sky play to finish in a tie for eighth place. On October 8, 2016, the school self-imposed a postseason ban amid an ongoing NCAA investigation.

Previous season
The Bears finished the 2015–16 season 10–21, 7–11 in Big Sky play to finish in ninth place. They lost to Portland State in the first round of the Big Sky tournament.

On April 21, 2016, the school fired head coach B. J. Hill amid an NCAA investigation into "serious and concerning" allegations of violations within the program. On May 1, the school hired Jeff Linder as head coach.

Departures

Incoming Transfers

2016 incoming recruits

Roster

Schedule and results

|-
!colspan=9 style=| Exhibition

|-
!colspan=9 style=| Non-conference regular season

|-
!colspan=9 style=| Big Sky regular season

References

Northern Colorado Bears men's basketball seasons
Northern Colorado
Northern Colorado Bears men's basketball
Northern Colorado Bears men's basketball